Symbiotic culture of bacteria and yeast (SCOBY) is a culinary symbiotic fermentation culture (starter) consisting of lactic acid bacteria (LAB), acetic acid bacteria (AAB), and yeast which arises in the preparation of sour foods and beverages such as kombucha. Beer and wine also undergo fermentation with yeast, but the lactic acid bacteria and acetic acid bacteria components unique to SCOBY are usually viewed as a source of spoilage rather than a desired addition. Both LAB and AAB enter on the surface of barley and malt in beer fermentation and grapes in wine fermentation; LAB lower the pH of the beer while AAB take the ethanol produced from the yeast and oxidize it further into vinegar, resulting in a sour taste and smell. AAB are also responsible for the formation of the cellulose SCOBY.

In its most common form, SCOBY is a gelatinous, cellulose-based biofilm or microbial mat found floating at the container's air-liquid interface. This bacterial cellulose mat is sometimes called a pellicle. SCOBY pellicles, like sourdough starters, can serve the purpose of continuing the fermentation process into a new vessel and reproducing the desired product. This can be attributed to SCOBY's ability to house not only the symbiotic growth, but a small amount of the previous media and product due to its ability to absorb water. SCOBYs can vary greatly in cell density within the biofilm due to fermentation conditions, leading to possible variations in the end product; numerous studies are currently taking place to determine the optimal ratio of SCOBY, if any, to liquid culture to ensure highest product consistency, as there are no standard operating procedures in place. Further information such as the organisms and culture conditions necessary to ferment and form a SCOBY, biofilm characteristics, and applications in foods and beverages with specific emphasis in kombucha can be found below.

Co-culture composition and conditions 
Based on the desired product of the SCOBY, different species of bacteria and yeast are used. Such cultures generally include aerobic, gram negative AAB species such as Acetobacter, Gluconobacter and Komagataeibacter, aerobic, gram positive LAB such as Lactobacillus, as well as various yeasts such as Saccharomyces and Zygosaccharomyces. Strains are pre-screened for viability under compatible conditions, increased yield of desired product, and indisposition to compete; once chosen, various culture conditions are modified for optimal growth and productivity.

For kombucha SCOBYs, the first step is yeast fermentation of sugars such as glucose from black or green tea into ethanol and carbon dioxide. Zygosaccharomyces is reported to be involved in 84.1% of all kombucha SCOBY fermentation processes due to its improved stability in high sugar and halophilic conditions, while Saccharomyces is predominantly used for its efficient fermentation rates and resistance to high temperature and alcohol content. Different variations of yeast can also be added as either a supplemental means to introduce different flavors and aromas or ensure reaction completion by utilizing different niches. While these niches vary yeast to yeast, certain fermentation conditions remain consistent. Such conditions include but are not limited to high substrate concentration, sufficient oxygen levels, temperatures between 20 °C and 30 °C, and a pH between 4-4.5.

The second step in the formation of SCOBY is the introduction of different bacteria into the liquid culture to convert the ethanol product of fermentation into organic acids such as lactic acid or acetic acid. These processes are known as lactic acid fermentation and ethanol metabolism respectively. A possible byproduct of this reaction is cellulose, which serves as the foundation for the SCOBY biofilm. Like yeasts, the species of bacteria chosen as well as culture conditions directly affect both the characteristics of the liquid kombucha product as well as the composition and morphology of the SCOBY pellicle. While there are many species that have the mechanisms necessary to form cellulose such as Acetobacter and Komagataeibacter, Gluconaceobacter are one of the most populous used, residing in between 86-99% of both liquid and biofilm cultures. The necessary culturing conditions of these bacteria are similar to that of yeasts, but require more oxygen due to their aerobic nature in oxidizing ethanol to form organic acids.

Once the internal conditions of the co-culture are in place, the symbiotic mixture is left to ferment. Certain studies have claimed optimal fermentation time to be 10 days, but the duration can be modified to change the contents of the yield; greater fermentation times correlate with higher levels of organic acids and other amino acids, which can attribute to the sour undertones of some Kombucha. Despite controls in place, the species comprising the mixed cultures can still initiate metabolic change preparation to preparation with the slightest change in co-culture conditions and alter product qualities such as sugar concentration, so adequate monitoring is necessary when running in a continuous mode or reusing a starter culture.

Biofilm characteristics 
The formation of the cellulose pellicle at the surface of the broth yields a product with unique characteristics that both bacteria and consumers find advantageous. Upon inoculation into the culture, bacteria such as Acetobacter immediately begin pulling glucose molecules together outside of the cell and joining them via β(1-4) linkages to form long, slender structures extending from their cell membranes called fibrils. The nanocellulose composing these fibrils demonstrates great strength and stability while still allowing hydrophilic interactions and biocompatibility, making it a great resource for the culture to use. A variety of inter and intramolecular bonding events join numerous fibrils together into the final, much larger structures known as microfibrils; because of the integrity of the microfibrils and the organized, linear nature of cellulose bonds, the resulting biofilm can also be referred to as a matrix or mat. This biofilm is a natural defense mechanism for the co-culture, and can withstand extreme conditions such as temperature and UV radiation. Two additional characteristics of the nanofibril cellulose SCOBY—its high purity and crystallinity—are currently a target in biomedical research in the formation of biocompatible tissue scaffolds, cardiovascular components such as blood vessels, bone grafts, and connective tissue replacements. The nanocellulose fibrils can also be extracted via acid hydrolysis and used in the food packaging, clothing, and wastewater treatment industries.

The thickness of a kombucha SCOBY is contingent on all brewing conditions, but one study reported an average a thickness of two to five millimeters. SCOBYs can be divided to start multiple cultures or dehydrated for storage and later use. Once removed, the culture will begin to regenerate a new pellicle known informally as a "baby SCOBY." This process can be repeated multiple times for months at a time.

Use in food production
In addition to kombucha, there are a variety of other foods and beverages which require a similar "symbiotic culture" in their production such as:

 Ginger beer
 Jun, a drink similar to kombucha
 Kefir
 Sourdough bread, which uses starters based on wild yeasts
 Tibicos
 Vinegar, the production of which requires a mother of vinegar
 Soy Sauce
 Soy Bean Paste
 Rice wine
Lambic

Use in clothing production
Queensland University of Technology and the State Library of Queensland have been using kombucha scoby to produce a workable bio-textile, called a "vegan leather".

See also
Acetic acid bacteria
Lactic acid bacteria

References

Further reading
 Program entitled "The Fermentation Revival" on BBC News.
 N. Padilla "do it yourself article in The Harvard Crimson.

External links
Purported list of kombucha yeast and bacteria, at "Cultures for Health."

Bacteria
Fermented foods
Symbiosis
Yeasts